Keady railway station was on the Castleblayney, Keady and Armagh Railway in Northern Ireland.

The Castleblayney, Keady and Armagh Railway opened the station on 1 February 1909.

It closed for passengers on 1 February 1932 and for goods on 1 October 1957.

Routes

References

Disused railway stations in County Armagh
Railway stations opened in 1909
Railway stations closed in 1932
Railway stations in Northern Ireland opened in the 20th century